Thomas James Harrison (born January 18, 1945) is a former Major League Baseball pitcher.

Although he was a pitcher, Harrison made his major league debut as a pinch runner. Ten days later, he made his pitching debut, giving up one run in one inning.

Notes

External links

1945 births
Canadian expatriate baseball players in the United States
Living people
Major League Baseball players from Canada
Sportspeople from Trail, British Columbia
Kansas City Athletics players
Daytona Beach Islanders players
Major League Baseball pitchers
Baseball people from British Columbia